The Big Fish Golf Club  is a public golf course in Hayward, Wisconsin, in Sawyer County, Wisconsin, United States. Golfweek has rated it the "#7 Public Course in Wisconsin".  It was designed in 2004 by the renowned golf architect, Pete Dye.

Hole By Hole

External links
Big Fish Golf Club

Golf clubs and courses in Wisconsin
Buildings and structures in Sawyer County, Wisconsin
Tourist attractions in Sawyer County, Wisconsin